The lentil (Lens culinaris or Lens esculenta) is an edible legume. It is an annual plant known for its lens-shaped seeds. As a food crop, the largest producer is Canada, producing 45% of the world’s total lentils.

Lentils are used around the world for culinary purposes. In cuisines of the Indian subcontinent, where lentils are a staple, split lentils (often with their hulls removed) known as dal are often cooked into a thick curry/gravy that is usually eaten with rice or rotis. Elsewhere, such as in Iran, Ethiopia, the Americas and Europe, lentils are used in stews and soups.

Botanical description

Name 

Many different names in different parts of the world are used for the crop lentil. The first use of the word lens to designate a specific genus was in the 16th century by the botanist Tournefort. The word "lens" for the lentil is of classical Roman/Latin origin: McGee points out that a prominent Roman family took the name "Lentulus", just as the family name "Cicero" was derived from the chickpea, Cicer arietinum, or "Fabia" (as in Quintus Fabius Maximus) from the fava bean (Vicia faba).

Systematics 

The genus Lens is part of the subfamily Faboideae which is contained in the flowering plant family Fabaceae or commonly known as legume or bean family, of the order Fabales in the kingdom Plantae.

Lens is a small genus which consists of the cultivated L. culinaris and six related wild taxa. Among the different taxa of wild lentils, L. orientalis is considered to be the progenitor of the cultivated lentil and is now generally classified as L. culinaris subsp. orientalis.

Lentil is hypogeal, which means the cotyledons of the germinating seed stay in the ground and inside the seed coat. Therefore, it is less vulnerable to frost, wind erosion, or insect attack.

It has many hairy branches and its stem is slender and angular. The rachis bears 10 to 15 leaflets in five to eight pairs. The leaves are alternate, of oblong-linear and obtuse shape and from yellowish green to dark bluish green in colour. In general, the upper leaves are converted into tendrils, whereas the lower leaves are mucronate. If stipules are present, they are small. The flowers, one to four in number, are small, white, pink, purple, pale purple, or pale blue in colour. They arise from the axils of the leaves, on a slender footstalk almost as long as the leaves. The seeds can also be mottled and speckled. The several cultivated varieties of lentil differ in size, hairiness, and colour of the leaves, flowers, and seeds.

Lentils are self-pollinating. The flowering begins from the lowermost buds and gradually moves upward, so-called acropetal flowering. About two weeks are needed for all the flowers to open on the single branch. At the end of the second day and on the third day after the opening of the flowers, they close completely and the colour begins to fade. After three to four days, the setting of the pods takes place.

Types 

Types can be classified according to their size, whether they are split or whole, or shelled or unshelled. Seed coats can range from light green to deep purple, as well as being tan, grey, brown, black or mottled. Shelled lentils show the colour of the cotyledon which can be yellow, orange, red, or green.

Red-cotyledon types:
 Nipper (Australia)
 Northfield (Australia)
 Cobber (Australia)
 Digger (Australia)
 Nugget (Australia)
 Aldinga (Australia)
 Masoor dal (unshelled lentils with a brown seed coat and an orange-red cotyledon)
 Petite crimson (shelled Masoor lentils)
 Red Chief (light tan seed coat and red cotyledon)

Small green/brown-seed coat types:
 Eston Green
 Pardina (Spain)
 Verdina (Spain)

Medium green/brown-seed coat types
 Avondale (United States)
 Matilda (Australia)
 Richlea

Large green/brown-seed coat types:
 Boomer (Australia)
 Brewer's: a large brown lentil which is often considered the "regular" lentil in the United States
 Castellana (Spanish)
 Laird: the commercial standard for large green lentils in western Canada
 Mason
 Merrit
 Mosa (Spain)
 Naslada (Bulgaria)
 Pennell (United States)
 Riveland (United States)

Other types:
 Beluga: black, bead-like, lens-shaped, almost spherical, named for resemblance to beluga caviar. Called Indianhead in Canada.
 Macachiados: big yellow Mexican lentils
 Puy lentils (var. puyensis): Small dark speckled blue-green lentil from France with a Protected Designation of Origin name
 Alb-Leisa three traditional genotypes of lentils native to the Swabian Jura (Alps) in Germany and protected by the producers' association Öko-Erzeugergemeinschaft Alb-Leisa (engl. "Eco-producer association Alb-Leisa")

Production 
In 2020, global production of lentils was 6.5 million tonnes, led by Canada with 45% and India with 18% of the world total (table). Saskatchewan is the most productive growing region in Canada, producing 95% of the national total. In India, Madhya Pradesh and Uttar Pradesh are largest producers, together producing more than 70% of the total. Other major producers include West Bengal and Bihar.

Cultivation

History 

The cultivated lentil Lens culinaris subsp. culinaris was derived from its wild subspecies L. culinaris subsp. orientalis, although other species may also have contributed some genes, according to Jonathan Sauer (Historical Geography of Crop Plants, 2017.) Unlike their wild ancestors, domesticated lentil crops have indehiscent pods and non-dormant seeds.

Lentil was domesticated in the Fertile Crescent of the Near East and then spread to Europe, the Middle East, North Africa and the Indo-Gangetic plain. The primary center of diversity for the domestic Lens culinaris as well as its wild progenitor L. culinaris ssp. orientalis is considered to be the Middle East. The oldest known carbonized remains of lentil from Greece's Franchthi Cave are dated to 11,000 BC. In archaeobotanical excavations carbonized remains of lentil seeds have been recovered from widely dispersed places such as Tell Ramad in Syria (6250-5950 BC), Aceramic Beidha in Jordan, Hacilar in Turkey (5800-5000 BC), Tepe Sabz (Ita. Tepe Sabz) in Iran (5500-5000 BC) and Argissa-Magula Tessaly in Greece (6000-5000 BC), along other places.

Soil requirements 
Lentils can grow on various soil types, from sand to clay loam, growing best in deep sandy loam soils with moderate fertility. A soil pH around 7 would be the best. Lentils do not tolerate flooding or water-logged conditions.

Lentils improve the physical properties of soils and increase the yield of succeeding cereal crops. Biological nitrogen fixation or other rotational effects could be the reason for higher yields after lentils.

Climate requirements 
The conditions under which lentils are grown differ across different growing regions. In the temperate climates lentils are planted in the winter and spring under low temperatures and vegetative growth occurs in later spring and the summer. Rainfall during this time is not limited. In the subtropics, lentils are planted under relatively high temperatures at the end of the rainy season, and vegetative growth occurs on the residual soil moisture in the summer season. Rainfall during this time is limited. In West Asia and North Africa, some lentils are planted as a winter crop before snowfall. Plant growth occurs during the time of snow melting. Under such cultivation, seed yields are often much higher.

Seedbed requirements and sowing 
The lentil requires a firm, smooth seedbed with most of the previous crop residues incorporated. For the seed placement and for later harvesting it is important that the surface is not uneven with large clods, stones, or protruding crop residue. It is also important that the soil be made friable and weed-free, so that seeding can be done at a uniform depth.

The plant densities for lentils vary between genotypes, seed size, planting time and growing conditions, and also from region to region. In West Asian countries, a higher seed rate is recommended, and also leads to a higher yield. In agriculturally mechanized countries, lentils are planted using grain drills, but many other areas still hand broadcast.

Cultivation management, fertilization 
In intercropping systems – a practice commonly used in lentil cultivation – herbicides may be needed to assure crop health. Like many other legume crops, lentils can fix atmospheric nitrogen in the soil with specific rhizobia. Lentils grow well under low fertilizer input conditions, although phosphorus, nitrogen, potassium, and sulfur may be used for nutrient-poor soils.

Diseases 

Below is a list of the most common lentil diseases.

Fungal diseases

Nematodes, parasitic

Viral diseases

Use by humans

Processing  
A combination of gravity, screens and air flow is used to clean and sort lentils by shape and density. After destoning, they may be sorted by a color sorter and then packaged.

A major part of the world's red lentil production undergoes a secondary processing step. These lentils are dehulled, split and polished. In the Indian subcontinent, this process is called dal milling. The moisture content of the lentils prior dehulling is crucial to guarantee a good dehulling efficiency. The hull of lentils usually accounts for 6 to 7 percent of the total seed weight, which is lower than most legumes. Lentil flour can be produced by milling the seeds, like cereals.

Culinary use 

Lentils can be eaten soaked, germinated, fried, baked or boiled – the most common preparation method. The seeds require a cooking time of 10 to 40 minutes, depending on the variety; small varieties with the husk removed, such as the common red lentil, require shorter cooking times (and unlike most legumes don't require soaking). Most varieties have a distinctive, earthy flavor. Lentils with husks remain whole with moderate cooking, while those without husks tend to disintegrate into a thick purée, which may enable various dishes. The composition of lentils leads to a high emulsifying capacity which can be even increased by dough fermentation in bread making.

Lentil dishes 
Lentils are used worldwide in many different dishes. Lentil dishes are most widespread throughout South Asia, the Mediterranean regions, West Asia, and Latin America. 
In the Indian subcontinent, Fiji, Mauritius, Singapore and the Caribbean, lentil curry is part of the everyday diet, eaten with both rice and roti. Boiled lentils and lentil stock are used to thicken most vegetarian curries. They are also used as stuffing in dal parathas and puri for breakfast or snacks. Lentils are also used in many regional varieties of sweets. Lentil flour is used to prepare several different bread varieties, such as papadam.

They are frequently combined with rice, which has a similar cooking time. A lentil and rice dish is referred to in Levantine countries as mujaddara or mejadra. In Iran, rice and lentil is served with fried raisin; this dish is called adas polo. Rice and lentils are also cooked together in khichdi, a popular dish in the Indian subcontinent (India and Pakistan); a similar dish, kushari, made in Egypt, is considered one of two national dishes.

Lentils are used to prepare an inexpensive and nutritious soup throughout Europe and North and South America, sometimes combined with chicken or pork. In Western countries, cooked lentils are often used in salads. In Italy, the traditional dish for New Year's Eve is Cotechino served with lentils.

Lentils are commonly eaten in Ethiopia in a stew-like dish called kik, or kik wot, one of the dishes people eat with Ethiopia's national food, injera flatbread. Yellow lentils are used to make a non-spicy stew, which is one of the first solid foods Ethiopians feed their babies.

Lentils were a chief part of the diet of ancient Iranians, who consumed lentils daily in the form of a stew poured over rice.

Nutritional value

Composition 

According to the USDA National Nutrient Database,  of raw lentils (variety unspecified) provide  of food energy; the same weight of cooked lentils provides . Raw lentils are 8% water, 63% carbohydrates including 11% dietary fiber, 25% protein, and 1% fat (table). Cooked lentils (when boiled) are a rich source (20% or more of the Daily Value, DV) of numerous essential nutrients, including folate (45% DV), iron (25% DV), manganese (24% DV), and phosphorus (26% DV). They are a good source (10% or more of the Daily Value) of several nutrients including thiamine (15% DV), pantothenic acid (13% DV), vitamin B6 (14% DV), magnesium (10% DV), copper (13% DV), and zinc (13%) (see table). When lentils are cooked by boiling, protein content declines to 9% of total composition, and B vitamins and minerals decrease due to the overall water content increasing (protein itself is not lost). Lentils have the second-highest ratio of protein to food energy of any legume, after soybeans.  Lentils contain the carotenoids lutein and zeaxanthin, as well as polyunsaturated fatty acids.

Digestive effects 
The low levels of readily digestible starch (5 percent) and high levels of slowly digested starch make lentils of potential value to people with diabetes. The remaining 65% of the starch is a resistant starch classified as RS1. A minimum of 10% in starch from lentils escapes digestion and absorption in the small intestine (therefore called "resistant starch"). Additional resistant starch is synthesized from gelatinized starch, during cooling, after lentils are cooked.

Lentils also have antinutrient factors, such as trypsin inhibitors and a relatively high phytate content. Trypsin is an enzyme involved in digestion, and phytates reduce the bioavailability of dietary minerals. The phytates can be reduced by prolonged soaking and fermentation or sprouting. Cooking nearly completely removes the trypsin inhibitor activity; sprouting is also effective.

Breeding 
Although lentils have been an important crop for centuries, lentil breeding and genetic research have a relatively short history compared to that of many other crops. Since the inception of The International Center for Agriculture Research in the Dry Areas (ICARDA) breeding programme in 1977 significant gains have been made. It supplies landraces and breeding lines for countries around the world, supplemented by other programmes in both developing (e.g. India) and developed (e.g. Australia and Canada) countries. In recent years, such collaborations among breeders and agronomists are becoming increasingly important.

The focus lies on high yielding and stable cultivars for diverse environments to match the demand of a growing population. In particular, progress in quantity and quality as well as in the resistance to disease and abiotic stresses are the major breeding aims. Several varieties have been developed applying conventional breeding methodologies. Serious genetic improvement for yield has been made, however, the full potential of production and productivity could not yet be tapped due to several biotic and abiotic stresses.

Wild Lens species are a significant source of genetic variation for improving the relatively narrow genetic base of this crop. The wild species possess many diverse traits including disease resistances and abiotic stress tolerances. The above-mentioned L. nigricans and L. orientalis possess morphological similarities to the cultivated L. culinaris. But only L. culinaris and L. culinaris subsp. orientalis are crossable and produce fully fertile seed. Between the different related species hybridisation barriers exist. According to their inter-crossability Lens species can be divided into three gene pools:

 Primary gene pool: L. culinaris (and L. culinaris subsp. orientalis) and L. odemensis
 Secondary gene pool: L. ervoides and L. nigricans
 Tertiary gene pool: L. lamottei and L. tomentosus

Crosses generally fail between members of different gene pools. However, plant growth regulators and/or embryo rescue allows the growth of viable hybrids between groups. Even if crosses are successful, many undesired genes may be introduced as well in addition to the desired ones. This can be resolved by using a backcrossing programme. Thus, mutagenesis is crucial to create new and desirable varieties. According to Yadav et al. other biotechnology techniques which may impact on lentil breeding are micro-propagation using meristamatic explants, callus culture and regeneration, protoplast culture and doubled haploid production.

There is a proposed revision of the gene pools using SNP phylogeny.

See also 

 Dal
 Lentil soup
 Lentils with Swabian pasta
 Mujaddara
 National Lentil Festival

References

Further reading 
 Alan Davidson, The Oxford Companion to Food. 
 S S Yadav et al. Lentil: An Ancient Crop for Modern Times. (2007). Springer Verlag. .

External links 

 Lentils – Country Production, Consumption, Exports, and Imports Statistics
 Alternative Field Crops Manual: Lentil

 
Pulse crop diseases
Fabeae
Edible legumes
Founder crops